Leo Wrye Zimmerman (September 21, 1924 – April 1, 2008) was an abstract artist who founded The Society for the Arts in Louisville and was a prolific Louisville artist for over 50 years. His unique style combined art, philosophy, and invention. Zimmerman was born in Timlin, Pennsylvania, but moved to and grew up in his mother's hometown of Louisville, Kentucky.  He attended Centre College in Danville, Kentucky with the intent to study medicine and follow in the footsteps of his father, Dr. Leo Zimmerman.  Shortly after his first school year, with World War II in full swing, he joined the army, worked as a medic, then in Special Services in Biarritz and Paris and determined that art was his path. After serving honorably, and studying art while awaiting a ship home, Zimmerman returned to Louisville and won first prize in the Ashland Oil Company art contest.

Proceeds from the award were enough to allow Zimmerman and his new bride, Marie Kavanaugh Graves, to go to Paris. In Paris for five years, Zimmerman mixed with the top abstract artists of the 1950s including Robert Breer, Jean Dewasne, Auguste Herbin, Fernand Léger, Edgar Pillet, Jack Youngerman and Victor Vasarely.
 
In 1955, back in the States, continuing to paint but missing the cultural milieu of Paris, Zimmerman then founded The Society for The Arts in Louisville. This private club was the first Louisville organization dedicated to promoting and integrating all the arts, with a philosophy that Zimmerman summarized below,

“Art isn’t a commodity. It’s non-utilitarian, but it’s useful because it makes everybody grow … Art should be seen and known and talked about. I’m operating on that basis.”

The Society was nonprofit, supported through membership dues and advertising income from its publications, beginning with the 32-pagemonthly “Arts in Louisville Magazine". The publication later was renamed “The Louisvillian,” and then replaced by the biweekly,“The Gazette of the Arts in Louisville". The club held live performances that included jazz legends such as Dizzy Gillespie and Cannonball Adderley, as well as poetry readings, theatre performances, and folksinging.  Resisting pressure from local authorities, Arts in Louisville was the first integrated private club in the city.
  
The first edition of the Arts in Louisville magazine was published in 1953. The magazine was a forum for artists to write freely about their lives and artistic concerns. Zimmerman published the magazine, designed the covers and set the type with his own typographic equipment. The Society for The Arts disbanded in 1963 from “staff cultural exhaustion,”Zimmerman wrote in an entry for “The Encyclopedia of Louisville." [reference 1]

The Louisville arts movement, still vibrant, became so renowned that Life magazine sent photographer Alfred Eisenstaedt to the city on assignment to photograph Zimmerman, fellow artist and teacher Joseph Fitzpatrick, who edited the magazine Zimmerman founded, and other colleagues.

Five years in Paris working with pioneers in abstract art combined with the Arts in Louisville experience set Zimmerman's artistic direction. His artistic efforts evolved from “hard–edge” abstract paintings, large "rural murals", to rotating optical illusions called “Slu Balls”, and over 1000 computer-generated paintings. Zimmerman's “Slu Balls” were exhibited at the University of Kentucky in 1989.  Significant periods in Leo's artistic development can be summarized as follows:

Silicoil 

Frustrated with the available products that damaged his brushes when he cleaned them, in 1954, Zimmerman invented a new brush cleaning system which he named “Silicoil”.  Silicoil became so popular with artists that Zimmerman patented the system and formed the Lion Company, Incorporated to manufacture and distribute the product domestically and internationally. Today – after over 50 years in the market - Silicoil remains one of the leading brush cleaning systems and 2022 was its best year on record.

Artistic development 

'Zimmerman's early art career was as a painter. One  of his friends in Paris was Victor Vasarely, widely regarded as the father of Op-Art, and whose paintings are in the permanent collections of many museums around the world. Even though he achieved great fame he insisted on making his art accessible to everyone –which became one of Zimmerman's guiding principles and inspired his computer art in the late stage of his life.  Though Zimmerman became more of a behind-the-scenes artist (his last public show was in 1989 at the University of Kentucky under the nom de plume Leo Wrye), it's clear that he was a major force in establishing Louisville's art scene and a significant artist in his own right - being sought after for advice from an extended community of artists.  Leo's artistic progression does not lend itself to categorization, but at least four major periods can be seen.

Leo's work is being highlighted in the upcoming show, "Americans In Paris" Artists working In Post War France, 1946-1962.  In Paris Zimmerman became acquainted Edgar Pillet (1012-1996). He joined the artist organization ''Groupe Espace'. He connected with Robert Breer, Ellsworth Kelly, and Jack Youngerman. In Paris, he embraced hard-edge geometric abstraction and was especially attuned to colors. The artist who later went by Leo Wrye, returned to Louisville in 1953 and dedicated himself to invigorating the local arts communityhttps://greyartgallery.nyu.edu/exhibition/americans-in-paris/.

Americans In Paris]

Early work in oils 

After winning first prize in an art contest and buying a ticket to France, Zimmerman began his artistic pursuits as a painter while living in Paris from 1948-53. Zimmerman produced abstract oil paintings featuring crisp transitions between solid color areas.  This style of hard-edge geometrical abstraction recalls the earlier work of Wassily Kandinsky and Victor Vasarely.

Rural murals 

In working with Edgar Pillet, Zimmerman may have been influenced to create a series of murals in rural Kentucky on old barns. Pillet had designed a series of murals for a factory in Tours, France.  Zimmerman's vision was to take the old barns that dotted the Kentucky landscape and produce abstract murals for them. Zimmerman traveled the country to find candidate barns but met resistance from the farmers who owned them who were not easily convinced to be the visionaries to bring art to their rural communities.  Unfortunately, no existing structure exists today, though a photograph of one mural remains.

Slu Balls and kinetic art forms 

Kinetic art contains moving parts or depends on motion for its effect.[1] The moving parts are generally powered by wind, a motor or the observer.  The term kinetic sculpture refers to a class of art made primarily from the late 1950s through 1960s.  Zimmerman was aware of the various European modern art movements of the early 20th century, ranging from the abstract forms of the Russian Constructivists and the structuralist formulas of the Bauhaus, to the nonsensical universe of the Dadaists.  Through Zimmerman's familiarity with the Denise René Gallery, where he showed his works, he was exposed to the abstract work of many artists as Vasarely.  Zimmerman's primary original kinetic creations were his 17 piece suite of rotating Slu Balls.

Computer generated art 

Zimmerman first discovered computers in the early 1990s. Over a period of 15 years, he created thousands of electronic paintings on his Apple Macintosh Quadra 700 computer that combined motion with final presentation. The images were revealed in real time on the computer screen, taking several seconds to build, morph into dizzying shapes, and then conclude with a dramatic final image.
              
Leo Zimmerman died April 1, 2008, in Louisville.  He was buried at Cave Hill Cemetery in Louisville.

References 

http://www.louisvillephoto.org/forum/topics/2028691:Topic:23581?page=1&commentId=2028691%3AComment%3A24184&x=1#2028691Comment24184

1924 births
2008 deaths
American abstract artists
United States Army personnel of World War II
American expatriates in France
Artists from Louisville, Kentucky
Burials at Cave Hill Cemetery